"Messages" is a song by Australian indie pop band San Cisco, released on 10 July 2020 as the second single from their fourth studio album Between You and Me (2020).

Background and release
"Messages" was released on 10 July 2020, alongside the announcement of San Cisco's fourth studio album Between You and Me. Lead vocalist Jordi Davieson said of the song in a press release: ""Messages" is a tongue-in-cheek bop about shitty friends. Originally the lyrics were loosely inspired by my frustration with [drummer] Scarlett never replying to my messages, but when we decided the track would be much better with her singing vocals instead, she added in a few of her annoyances about me. It turned into quite a constructive process for our friendship! She still never replies to messages..."

Composition and lyrics
Gigwise described the song as having "eighties synth [which] mingles with disco bass and splashy percussion" and "bittersweet" lyrics, whilst music critic Thomas Bleach noted the song as having a "pop aesthetic". The lyrics "explore the annoyances of shitty friendships and highlights the frustrating reality of being left on read."

Critical reception
Al Newstead of Triple J labelled the song "another upbeat pop".

Jessie Atkinson of Gigwise described the song as a "bubblegum new cut", further stating "evokes the feeling of going out on the town even when you're feeling a bit down in the dumps."

Thomas Bleach called the song a "short and punchy pop track", additionally describing it as a "playful concept... executed in a really upbeat fashion."

Music video
The music video was released on 9 July 2020 and was directed by Duncan Wright.

Synopsis
The music video depicts the band "performing at a dance with clips of drummer and singer Scarlett Stevens chatting on a lips designed phone whilst doing things like working out.

Reception
Gigwise praised the music video as a "total Austin Powers affair: all lemon yellow décor, hotpants and lip phones." Triple J's Al Newstead labelled it a "cracking" video. ColoRising found the set to be "vibrantly designed" and "clever", saying it gives the video a "fun and cheeky appeal".

Track listings

Credits and personnel
Adapted from the parent album's  liner notes.

San Cisco
 Jordi Davieson – writer, vocals
 Josh Biondillo – guitar, keys 
 Scarlett Stevens – drums, vocals

Other musicians
 James Ireland – production
 Steve Schram – production

References

External links
 

2020 singles
2020 songs
San Cisco songs
Disco songs
Songs written by Scarlett Stevens